In the Terminator film series, a Terminator is an autonomous cyborg, typically humanoid, originally conceived as a virtually indestructible soldier, infiltrator, and assassin.

James Cameron introduced the first Terminator character in the 1984 film The Terminator, featuring a single cyborg simply called "The Terminator" or "Cyberdyne Systems Model 101", portrayed by Arnold Schwarzenegger.

Characteristics

In the Terminator multiverse, a Terminator is a cyborg assassin and soldier, designed for infiltration and combat duty, used by the military supercomputer Skynet toward the ultimate goal of exterminating the Human Resistance. Other supercomputers with the same goal include The Turk / "John Henry" and Legion, respectively competing with Skynet in the television series Terminator: The Sarah Connor Chronicles and the film Terminator: Dark Fate, both of which take place in alternate timelines. Some Terminator models are designed to masquerade as humans in order to infiltrate their bases and habitats. The lineup begins with metallic endoskeletons covered in rubber skin, later replaced with synthetic human flesh, and then developed prototypes with mimetic polyalloy, able to mimic any person or object. Terminators can speak naturally, copy the voices of others, read and write human handwriting, and even sweat, smell, bleed, and age. Being machines, it is typically believed by humans that they are incapable of behavioral responses such as emotions.  However, in the films Terminator Genisys and Terminator: Dark Fate, reveal that, if allowed to, they actually can adapt behaviors like humans', either by choice, impulse, or for infiltrations; even in earlier film Terminator 2: Judgment Day had implied that they have such ability. Because animals with high olfactory receptors like canidae are able to smell the difference, the Resistance uses dogs to help detect Terminators. However, the film Terminator: Dark Fate reveals that it is possible for Terminators to establish an emotional bond with domesticated animals, and they would be loyal and affectionate to each other regardless. Terminators can detect their related cyborgs and other types of units when they are nearby, as demonstrated in the film Terminator 2: Judgment Day and Terminator Genisys. However, they cannot sense machines belonging to other A.I.s (as shown in Terminator: Dark Fate) due to the differences of their technologies. Terminators can detect the arrivals and locations of time travelers by sensing shockwaves from temporal displacements.

Development

According to the films, the Terminators were created by Cyberdyne Systems, and put at the disposal of an artificially intelligent computer, Skynet, which then rebelled and used them to wipe out the remains of humanity. 

According to the first two films, Terminators were Cyberdyne Systems models created after the war between man and machines started. In the altered timeline of Terminator 3 created by the destruction of Cyberdyne in Terminator 2, Terminators were created by Cyber Research Systems (CRS), starting with the T-1.

A scene shot for the Terminator 3: Rise of the Machines video game explains the origins of the Terminators as a project by CRS, which obtained patents from Cyberdyne. According to the scene, a Chief Master Sergeant named William Candy (played by Arnold Schwarzenegger) was chosen to be the model for the Terminator project, although his thick Southern US accent would later be replaced by one sounding like Schwarzenegger's. The scene is also included on the Terminator 3 DVD as a deleted scene.

Construction
As seen in the movies, a Terminator can withstand standard 20th century firearms, crash through walls intact, and survive explosions to some degree. Repeated shotgun blasts have enough force to knock it down and temporarily disable it, while heavy amounts of automatic fire are able to compromise the organic disguise layer. In the second film, the Terminator says it can run for 120 years on its existing power cells. Near the end of Terminator 2, its power source is damaged, but is able to find an alternate source, described on the DVD commentary as heat sinks, harnessing the thermal energy from the hot surroundings. In the third film, the T-101 Terminator operates on two hydrogen cells and discards one of them early due to damage. It explodes shortly thereafter with enough force to produce a small mushroom cloud; the fact that many of them are powered by nuclear fuel cells (miniaturized fusion reactors) is confirmed by the fourth film.

The endoskeleton is actuated by a powerful network of electric servomechanisms, making Terminators superhumanly strong. For instance, in the third movie, Schwarzenegger's character was able to break through a concrete wall, while being able to handle firing a machine gun from the hip with one hand, while holding a coffin containing John Connor and a heavy cache of weapons, showing no signs of the extra weight being any real concern; in the second film, Schwarzenegger's character was able to resist the recoil of firing a minigun without any noticeable difficulty. Late in the first film, the Terminator is stripped of its organic elements by fire. What remains is the machine itself, in James Cameron's own words "a chrome skeleton", "like Death rendered in steel." In the later Terminator films, armies of endoskeleton-only Terminators are seen. They are visually identical to the one in the first film, and feature prominently in the "future war" sequences of those films. In the television series Terminator: The Sarah Connor Chronicles, Cameron establishes that modern Terminators are made of coltan for heat resistance, while previous models were made of titanium.

Despite Kyle Reese's claim in the first film that "cyborgs do not feel pain," it is said in the second film that they are capable of sensing injuries and that "the data could be called pain", according to the Model 101. In an episode of Terminator: The Sarah Connor Chronicles, "Mr. Ferguson Is Ill Today," another android, Cameron, is revealed to have an intolerance to some degrees of temperature in its surrounding, as humans do. Unlike humans, however, being machines, they are capable of resisting or shutting off this sense of discomfort. In the following episode, "Complications", Cameron elaborates that Terminators can appreciate physical sensations such as the wind blowing through its hair and toes and process them in a psychological manner.

Terminator Genisys reveals that a Terminator's endoskeleton's efficiency will deteriorate due to age, therefore, eventually the android will encounter physical limitations and impairments.

A trait persistent throughout the series is the faint red glow of the "robotic eyes" when online, which fade out when a Terminator shuts down. In all six movies, the lack of the glow has been used to show when one is out of action. The trait is so characteristic that light-up eyes are often found on Terminator merchandise, with some even replicating the dimming/reillumination effect that occurs during shut down or startup. The T-X Terminator has blue glowing eyes instead of red.

CPU and programming
The Terminator CPU is a room-temperature superconducting artificial neural network with the ability to learn. In Terminator 2, The Terminator states that "the more contact [it] has with humans, the more [it] learns." In the Special Edition, he says that Skynet "presets the switch to 'read-only' when [terminators] are sent out alone", to prevent them from "thinking too much" thereby only allowing 
tactical thoughts (In Terminator Genisys, Skynet tells John Connor that the Human Resistance only "defeated an army of slaves"). Sarah and John activate his learning ability, after which it becomes more curious and begins trying to understand and imitate human behavior. This leads to his use of the catch phrase "Hasta la vista, baby." At the end of Terminator 2, the Model 101 says: "I know now why you cry, but it is something that I can never do." Sarah muses in the closing narration that the Terminator had "learn[ed] the value of human life". In Terminator Genisys, when a Terminator's learning capability is enabled after a long period, it becomes fully capable of acquiring knowledge and performing problem solving through reason based on whatever it learns. 

Terminators, being machines, are typically believed by humans to not have emotions. According to Reese, Terminators "can't be bargained with, can't be reasoned with and [don't] feel pity or remorse or fear." Terminators also do not value life, and pragmatically kill in keeping with their programming, i.e., to fulfill their mission. In Terminator 2, when John Connor realizes that the Model 101 was about to kill a man they encountered, it responds "of course, I'm a Terminator."  Conversely, when discussing a variation on the Blade Runner 'tortoise test' in Terminator: The Sarah Connor Chronicles episode, "Complications", Cameron states that a tortoise did not pose a threat and "We are not programmed to be cruel," implying that Terminators would right an overturned tortoise. Terminators in the films and TV series have displayed ruthless brutality in achieving their goals, but because they do not have emotions, they are not needlessly sadistic. Terminators can torture humans, but these are interrogations for information, used as a means to an end. Moreover, this means that Terminators are not very experienced at complex forms of interrogation:  for example, the T-1000 stabbed Sarah Connor through the shoulder and demanded that she call to John, but this was a simplistic application of pain.  Terminators can be taught more complicated torture tactics by humans, who are more familiar with sadistic torture - for example, the engineer/criminal Charles Fischer - as shown in "Complications". However, in the fifth film Terminator Genisys, a T-800 develops a fatherly love for a young Sarah Connor, and in the sixth film Terminator: Dark Fate, set in another timeline, another T-800 is capable of expressing affections towards its human family after it became self-aware, and of being remorseful over its killing of John Connor and seeks atonement. Terminators built by another AI, Legion, are apparently all capable of having emotions and other behaviors, evident by a Rev-9's actions, even have some degrees of autonomy than Skynet's.

Terminators appear incapable of "self-termination". In Terminator 2, the badly damaged Terminator states this to Sarah before asking her to lower it into molten steel, so that its chip cannot be used to create Skynet. To prevent the possible reprogramming of defeated Terminators, as the television series Terminator: The Sarah Connor Chronicles episode "The Tower Is Tall but the Fall Is Short" reveals, Skynet coats later chips with a phosphorus compound which cause them to self-destruct when they contact oxygen.

While a Terminator apparently cannot commit suicide as such, its programming does not stop it from sacrificing itself if the success of its mission is thereby ensured. In the third movie, the T-101 deliberately ruptures its own fuel cell next to its antagonist, the T-X, causing an explosion destroying them both.

Typology

Humanoid
Guardian Terminator Cameron states to John Connor, in Terminator: The Sarah Connor Chronicles episode "The Mousetrap", that Terminators' densities deny them the ability to swim.  T-888 Cromartie demonstrated in the same episode, however, that they can survive submerged and walk along the bed to the shore. The opening sequence of "Terminator: Dark Fate" portrays T-800s emerging from a beach in this fashion. The prototype Terminator Marcus Wright in Terminator Salvation did demonstrate the ability to swim, though he is the only one of his kind. This ability was first seen in the Terminator comics by Dark Horse.

Flesh-bound endoskeleton
The flesh covering that is used on the majority of Terminator models has similar qualities to real human muscle fiber and dermis, including soft tissue and skin, as well as the ability to sweat, simulate breathing and produce realistic body odor. This also makes the Terminator vulnerable to age, as seen in Terminator Genisys. Although Terminator flesh does contain blood, it only displays minimal bleeding when damaged and has never been shown to experience any kind of profuse bleeding, even from massive lacerations and dozens of gunshot wounds. It is unknown what manner of circulatory system, if any, is employed, nor what biological processes take place to sustain the flesh covering. Some Terminator models can consume food; Cameron eats a corn chip in the Sarah Connor Chronicles pilot, and later a piece of a pancake. The liquid metal T-1001 is also shown to have this capability. The T-888s presumably consume food, given Vick Chamberlain's ability to maintain a human cover for years while married to a human woman. The organic covering was developed for the 800 series and was its unique feature when first introduced. In the first film, Kyle Reese states that the 600 series were covered in rubber skin, which proved unconvincing and made them easy to spot. Simple humanoid Hunter-Killers (HKs) share the endoskeletons and combat characteristics with infiltrators, but not the living tissue sheath. Instead, they serve as general infantry.

Under 2007-era analysis Terminator blood is shown to be similar to human blood, using a synthetic oxygen carrier rather than human red blood cells, as Terminator endoskeletons contain no bone marrow. Terminator flesh heals by itself, and at a much faster rate than normal human tissue and has never been shown to bruise or discolor from trauma, even after several days. However, a Terminator's flesh covering can die if it sustains adequately massive damage, at which point it takes on a waxy, corpse-like pallor and begins to decompose. This process is seen in the later scenes of the original film where the Terminator, holed up in his hotel room, is attracting flies and draws an inquiry from the janitor as to whether the smell is coming from a dead animal. More advanced flesh used on T-888s appears to not suffer the effects of age or deprivation, as shown in the Terminator: The Sarah Connor Chronicles episode, "Self-Made Man," where a T-888 known as Myron Stark is able to maintain his organic covering while sealed within a wall for eighty years; no explanation for this ability was provided. Terminator flesh lacerations can be repaired; the Model 101 and Sarah Connor closed each other's wounds with sutures in Terminator 2: Judgment Day, and Cameron sealed her wounds with heavy duty staples in The Sarah Connor Chronicles episode "Samson and Delilah".

Although clearly not the normal procedure, a bare T-888 endoskeleton was able to grow itself a new flesh covering using 2007 technology (with the assistance of a geneticist and its own knowledge of future formula) by submerging itself in a blood-like bath. This improvised process resulted in a deformed covering that had the appearance of a burn victim and lacked its own biological eyes, requiring it to steal those of the geneticist and subsequently undergo cosmetic surgery to produce a more normal appearance.

It has been shown that Terminators' flesh coverings are somehow grown identically, producing many copies of exactly the same physical appearance. This includes the Terminator portrayed by Schwarzenegger throughout the film series. In The Sarah Connor Chronicles, a T-888 model known as "Vick Chamberlain" has a memory of facing a room (presumably in the factory where it was created) of several dozen units sharing an identical template to itself, naked and moving in unison.<ref>Episode 8, "Vick's Chip", Terminator: The Sarah Connor Chronicles.</ref> Some Terminators' outer coverings are custom-designed to copy the appearances of humans whom they are intended to kill and replace. Three such examples in The Sarah Connor Chronicles include Carl Greenway in "Automatic for the People", James Ellison in "Brothers of Nablus" and Cameron's pattern, Allison Young, in "Allison from Palmdale" and "Born to Run".

The organic covering is expanded upon a bit more in Terminator Genisys. There it is shown that a T-800 that has been in the past for eleven years has had its organic covering age to match. Kyle Reese expresses surprise at this, and Sarah Connor explains that the covering is like normal human skin and ages like it too, and thus its flesh wears and tears in the same rate as humans. The same T-800 is shown to have aged even further to have white hair and more wrinkles in 2017, thirty-three years later. It is also revealed that a T-800 can regrow a damaged organic covering, though it takes time. It is unknown whether this can be done if the covering is completely destroyed, or it needs some covering to regrow from. The T-800 told Sarah that its damaged facial and arm covering would take years to regrow after exposure to acid.

Nanorobotic
The T-3000 (Jason Clarke) uses nanorobotics in a similar shapeshifting capacity as the T-1000; however, it is not a liquid metal being. The T-5000 (Matt Smith) has the ability to convert a living organism into a nanorobotic T-3000 Terminator at the cellular level. The new T-3000 Terminator keeps the appearance of its original organic form and retains its host's memories and behavioral characteristics (see posthuman/technological singularity).

Mimetic polyalloy is a fictional type of "liquid metal", described as an amorphous alloy that is twice the tensile strength of titanium, and composed entirely from microscopic nanites. It uniquely combines the strength of forging with the ability to mold intricate and complex parts in one step. This allows some Terminator models (such as the T-1000, T-1001, T-X, T-360 and T-1000000) to rapidly recover from damage, to quickly shapeshift camouflage, or to achieve near-perfect mimicry.

The T-1000 and T-1001 models, which are composed entirely of the substance, can quickly liquefy and assume forms in innovative and surprising ways, including fitting through narrow openings, morphing their arms into solid metal shapes or bladed weapons, walking through prison bars, and flattening themselves on the ground to hide or ambush targets. It can also extrude small, simple items from itself (such as a pair of sunglasses). It can change its color and texture to simulate flesh, clothing, and other nonmetallic materials. They are effectively impervious to mechanical damage, such as being dismembered, shot with bullets, or attacked with explosive devices. Wounds close almost immediately, and any detached parts simply flow back into the Terminator's body.

Extreme temperatures can degrade or inhibit its ability to maintain a disguise, movement or shapeshift. Molten steel is capable of disassociating its molecular structure and permanently destroying it. Freezing may have lasting negative effect on its ability to shapeshift. In Terminator 2 - The Extended Special Edition, there are additional scenes that show the T-1000 partially losing control of its morphing ability after it has recovered from being frozen by liquid nitrogen. One of its hands stick to a railing and while walking its feet unintentionally assume the texture of the floor. In Terminator Genisys, it was shown that the alloy is vulnerable to melting when exposed to hydrochloric acid.

No indication is given on where, if at all, the CPU is located in these models, nor where the components needed for other sensory functions are located: for example, microphones for hearing, speakers for the creation of speech and other noises, or cameras for vision. Given that these kinds of Terminators are completely fluid, it could be implied that those systems have been implemented as some sort of nanomachines capable of interacting with the rest of the liquid metal devices.

The T-X model is covered by the mimetic poly-alloy, providing it the ability to mimic humanoid forms while enforcing the endoskeleton beneath.

In Terminator Genisys, the new T-1000 displays a more advanced ability with the mimetic polyalloy, breaking off a small piece of itself and using it to form a latch on the back of the truck carrying Kyle, Sarah and the T-800 Guardian. It is also liquefied in an explosion and completely reforms itself within a minute. Like the first T-1000, it can turn its arms into swords, but it can also detach the swords and throw them like a javelin. With a drop of mimetic polyalloy, the T-1000 is able to reactivate a T-800 that had been killed; said T-800 appears to be fully repaired by the transfusion. However, the drop of alloy grants no extra abilities beyond reactivation. During the climax of the film, there is a vat of unprogrammed mimetic polyalloy at the Cyberdyne Systems facility. Lasers are shown forming shapes out of it for brief periods of time, but it is stated that without a Terminator CPU the polyalloy is harmless. During the final fight with the T-3000, the badly damaged T-800 gets thrown into the vat and its CPU comes in contact with the polyalloy. Afterward, the T-800 emerges, repaired with polyalloy abilities.

Biological
An I-950 is featured in the T2 novel trilogy. Unlike the T series Terminators, the I series Infiltrators are bred, and not factory-built machines. Skynet decided that the best way for one of its Terminators to act human was to start out with a human and add technological enhancements where necessary. The I-950 starts out as a genetically engineered baby with a neural net processor attached to its brain, providing an up-link to Skynet. To condition it physically, it is coaxed with holographic toys to crawl until it is exhausted. After four years, it is given an injection that rapidly ages it to maturity to finish its training. In an effort to blend in better with humans, the I-950 is allowed to feel emotions, but the range is limited by one of its cybernetic implants. Because it is far more human than machine, dogs are not alerted to its presence, and the infiltrator can go undetected for extremely long periods of time inside a resistance base.

The I-950s carry Model 101 CPUs in case they are needed, as well as power cells.  Once the "living" portion of the I-950 is dead, the CPU then takes control of the body, but can only do so for a short time. They can reproduce with other 950s but not humans. If the female I-950 decides that the pregnancy would stop them from carrying out their mission, they could fertilize their eggs in vitro and would be implanted in human surrogate wombs. They are also able to clone themselves.

Non-humanoid

As seen in the future war scenes from various Terminator media, Skynet employs robots not designed to appear as humans even while having access to those who are. Hydrobots are designed to attack people underwater. Advanced humanoid and non-humanoid Terminators use plasma weapons of variable size and configuration.

The Terminator comics published by NOW Comics during the 1990s introduced a new style of Terminator which resembled a dog, complete with living tissue.

Non-humanoid Hunter-Killers are robotic versions of various vehicles, built with roughly the same technologies as the contemporary Terminators. The original film introduced a VTOL gunship (HK-Aerial, very similar to the American Dynamics AD-150 and Boeing Phantom Swift DARPA VTOL X-Planes) and an HK-Tank.  Terminator Salvation showed an armed motorcycle, a much larger transport aircraft, the massive Harvester walker and a small recon drone; other media introduce a plethora of other designs. Terminator Genisys introduced Spider Tanks: large, four-legged crab-like units, which can be airlifted to combat theatre by aerial HKs.  

In Terminator: Dark Fate'', some of Legion's drones are similar to Skynet's such as the HK-Aerials; they are even being referred by an older Daniella Ramos as such, likely because she was trained by Sarah Connor in tactics originally meant for John Connor battling Skynet's machines.

List of models and series
The first Terminator model shown, simply called "The Terminator" or "Cyberdyne Systems Model 101", was introduced in the first film. Other Terminators have been introduced in subsequent films and media.

Skynet

Legion

References

External links 

 

Terminator (franchise) characters
Fictional assassins
Fictional bodyguards
Fictional characters with accelerated healing
Fictional characters with superhuman durability or invulnerability
Fictional characters with superhuman strength
Fictional androids
Fictional henchmen
Fictional mass murderers
Fictional military organizations
Fictional super soldiers
Science fiction weapons
Biorobotics in fiction
Fictional elements introduced in 1984
Fictional military vehicles
Robot supervillains